H. Pierre Noyes (December 10, 1923 – September 30, 2016) was an American theoretical physicist.  He became a member of the faculty at the SLAC National Accelerator Laboratory at Stanford University in 1962. Noyes specialized in several areas of research, including the relativistic few-body problem in nuclear and particle physics.

Family
Noyes was born in 1923 in Paris, France to the American chemist William Noyes and his third wife Katherine Macy, daughter of Jesse Macy.  His older half-brother was Albert (1898–1980) and his brother Richard (1919 – 1997); both were chemists.

Education 

Noyes received his baccalaureate degree in physics (magna cum laude) in 1943 from Harvard University. Noyes earned his Ph.D. in theoretical physics from the University of California at Berkeley in 1950 doing research under the direction of Robert Serber with Geoffrey Chew as his advisor.

After earning his Ph.D., Noyes spent a postdoctoral year on a Fulbright scholarship at the University of Birmingham, England.

Career
Noyes’ career included several academic and research positions.  He first worked as a post-doctoral fellow and then as assistant professor of Physics at the University of Rochester (1952–5).

In 1955, Noyes joined the Theoretical Division of what was to become the Lawrence Livermore National Laboratory.  From 1956 to 1962, he served there as group leader of the General Research Group, under co-founder and director Edward Teller.

During a sabbatical from his work at Lawrence Livermore in 1957 and 1958, Noyes was Leverhulme Trust Lecturer in the Experimental Physics Department of the University of Liverpool.  He also worked as a consultant to General Atomics under Freeman Dyson and Ted Taylor for Project Orion.

In 1961, Noyes served as AVCO visiting professor at Cornell University.

Starting in 1962, he worked at SLAC as head of theoretical physics until he was replaced by Sidney Drell (who combined that responsibility with being Deputy Director of SLAC). He progressed from associate professor from 1962 through 1967 to professor (at SLAC, 1967–2002) and was awarded emeritus status in that rank on May 1, 2000.

Noyes served as the Associate Editor of the Annual Review of Nuclear Science from 1962 until 1977. In 1979 he received an Alexander von Humboldt U.S. Senior Scientist Award, primarily to continue his theoretical work on the quantum mechanical three-body problem for strongly interacting particles.

Some of his letters to Gregory Breit (1899–1981) are in the collection of the Yale University Library.

Honors 
Noyes’s honors include:  
 Fulbright Scholarship (Birmingham, England) (1950-1)
 Alexander von Humboldt Senior Scientist Award (1979)
 Leverhulme Lecturer in the Experimental Physics Department of the University of Liverpool (1957-8)
 Scientific Essays in Honor of H Pierre Noyes on the Occasion of His 90th Birthday,  festschrift, edited by John C Amson (University of St Andrews, UK), Louis Kauffman (University of Illinois at Chicago, USA)

Publications 
 
 
 
 Phys. Rev. Lett. 3, 191–193 (1959) Modification of the Effective-Range Formula for Nucleon-Nucleon Scattering, in collaboration with David Y. Wong at the Lawrence Radiation Laboratory, University of California, Berkeley and Livermore, California
 Phys. Rev. Lett. 15, 538–540 (1965) New Nonsingular Integral Equation for Two-Particle Scattering, in collaboration with David Y. Wong at the Lawrence Radiation Laboratory, University of California, Berkeley and Livermore, California

References 

1923 births
2016 deaths
American expatriates in France
American nuclear physicists
Harvard University alumni
University of California, Berkeley alumni
University of Rochester faculty